Indrastra was the mythical weapon of Indian deity Indra which was invoked by the main character Arjuna many times in the Mahabharata war. When the divine weapon was shot it transformed into many arrows capable of killing many men.

Use in Mahabharata war 
On the fourteenth day of the war, when Arjuna wanted to kill King Jayadratha, Drona and Duryodhana sent their men to stop Arjuna. One of these was King Sudakshina, who threw his spear at Arjuna, striking  him and causing blood to flow. Kaurava's army thought that Arjuna had died but he got up and shot Indrastra, killing King Sudakshina and a large part of his army.

On the seventeenth day of the war Arjuna shot his Indrastra on the Samsaptakas killing many of them.

See also 

 Astra (weapon)

References

Weapons in Hindu mythology